Roberta Marzani (born 8 July 1996) is an Italian fencer who won a bronze medal at the 2019 Summer Universiade.

Biography

She won one of the bronze medals in the women's individual épée event at the 2022 Mediterranean Games held in Oran, Algeria.

See also
 Italy at the 2019 Summer Universiade

References

External links
 Roberta Marzani

1996 births
Living people
Italian female fencers
Sportspeople from Bergamo
Universiade medalists in fencing
Universiade silver medalists for Italy
Universiade bronze medalists for Italy
Medalists at the 2017 Summer Universiade
Medalists at the 2019 Summer Universiade
Mediterranean Games gold medalists for Italy
Mediterranean Games bronze medalists for Italy
Mediterranean Games medalists in fencing
Competitors at the 2018 Mediterranean Games
Competitors at the 2022 Mediterranean Games
20th-century Italian women
21st-century Italian women